IBM WebSphere DataPower SOA Appliances is a family of pre-built, pre-configured rack-mountable network devices (XML appliances) that can help accelerate XML and Web Services deployments while extending SOA infrastructure. Originally these devices were created by DataPower Technology Inc., which was acquired by IBM in October 2005.

This WebSphere family consists of rack-mountable network appliances, blade appliances, appliances that rack inside a z/OS mainframe, and virtual appliances. The appliances are designed to scale to meet the demands of growing organizations, with options for high availability and clustering for increased performance and reliability. DataPower SOA Appliances can be integrated with other IBM middleware products, such as WebSphere Application Server.

Appliance list

Based on Hardware Model 9235
 WebSphere DataPower Caching Appliance XC10
 WebSphere DataPower XML Accelerator XA35
 WebSphere DataPower Security Appliance XS40
 WebSphere DataPower Integration Appliance XI50
 WebSphere DataPower B2B Appliance XB60
 WebSphere DataPower Messaging Appliance XM70

This hardware model is a 1U rack mountable appliance that has 4 1Gb ethernet connections.

Based on Hardware Model 7198
 WebSphere DataPower Service Gateway XG45

This model is a 1U rack mountable appliance that has 4 1Gb ethernet connections and 2 10Gb ethernet connections.

Based on Hardware Model 7199
 WebSphere DataPower Caching Appliance XC10 V2
 WebSphere DataPower Integration Appliance XI52
 WebSphere DataPower B2B Appliance XB62
 WebSphere DataPower Edge Appliance XE82

This model is a 2U rack mountable appliance that has 8 1Gb ethernet connections and 2 10Gb ethernet connections.

Based on Hardware Model 8436
 IBM DataPower Gateway

This model is a 2U rack mountable appliance that has 8 1Gb ethernet connections and 2 10Gb ethernet connections.

Technical specifications
DataPower Appliances contain many hardware components, including ASIC-based IPS, custom encrypted RAID drives, and (optional) Hardware Security Modules.

DataPower Appliances operate a single digitally signed firmware containing a Linux-based operating system and application stack.  Its firmware runs on a flash storage device.  IBM updates the firmware image every 10–20 weeks. Users cannot run third-party applications on DataPower as they would need a traditional server and operating system.  Instead of a traditional filesystem, it runs with a collection of isolated virtual file systems called 'Application Domains'.  As a result, it can appear to its client connections to be any type of network file system with any type of folders and links.

DataPower firmware is mostly used to perform electronic messaging functions, like transformation and routing of messages as an enterprise service bus or to protect web services interfaces and the architecture behind them. It helps to integrate any two applications by considering them as services, and is platform and language independent.

Competitors in market

References

External links
 IBM WebSphere DataPower Home page
 WebSphere DataPower SOA Appliance performance tuning
 

DataPower SOA Appliances
WebSphere DataPower SOA Appliances
Networking hardware